Between 1981 and 2011, American rock band R.E.M. released 15 studio albums, four live albums, 14 compilation albums, one remix album, one soundtrack album, 12 video albums, seven extended plays, 63 singles, and 77 music videos. Formed in 1980 by singer Michael Stipe, guitarist Peter Buck, bassist Mike Mills, and drummer Bill Berry, the band was pivotal in the development of the alternative rock genre. Their musical style inspired many other alternative rock bands and musicians, and the band became one of the first alternative rock acts to experience breakthrough commercial success. R.E.M. have sold more than 90million albums worldwide, making them one of the best-selling music artists of all time.

Albums

Studio albums

Live albums

Compilation albums

Remix albums

Soundtrack albums

Video albums

Extended plays

Singles

1980s

1990s

2000s

2010s

Fan club-exclusive holiday singles
From 1988 through 2011, R.E.M. rewarded members of their official fan club with special, exclusive Christmas singles. These singles featured exclusive content, such as recordings of Christmas songs, cover songs, original material and live content.

On September 21, 2011, R.E.M. announced on their official website that their fan club would no longer accept new members or renewals following their disbandment. Consequently, Christmas singles ceased continuation that year, with an overall total of 24 singles.

Other charted songs / promo singles

Other appearances

Studio

Live and alternate

Music videos

Notes

References

External links
 Official website
 R.E.M. at AllMusic
 
 

Discography
Discographies of American artists
Rock music group discographies
Alternative rock discographies